James Elliott Naughtin (February 8, 1982 – June 14, 2012), known professionally as Erik Rhodes, was an American gay pornographic film actor and director. After making his adult film debut as a performer in 2004, Rhodes became an exclusive model with Falcon Studios, and began directing adult films for Raging Stallion Studios when the studio was acquired by Falcon in 2011. Beyond his work in pornography, Rhodes was active in New York City nightlife and celebrity circles, and was once linked to fashion designer Marc Jacobs. In 2012, Rhodes died from cardiac arrest at the age of 30.

Biography

Early life and career
Rhodes was born James Elliott Naughtin in Massapequa, New York. He has an identical twin brother, Jon Naughtin. Rhodes worked at a CVS and a sex shop before working as a stripper, go-go dancer, and a male escort, where he was discovered by a recruiter for the gay pornography studio Falcon Entertainment.  He broke into the adult film industry at the age of 22, in the 2004 film Flesh produced by Studio 2000. The role would be Rhodes' sole non-Falcon gay pornographic feature film; he would sign an exclusive contract with Falcon in 2004, and made his debut with the studio that same year with the film Super Soaked.

Over the course of his career, Rhodes appeared in over 40 scenes with Falcon, and directed eight films for the Falcon subsidiary Mustang Studios. He began appearing in films produced by Raging Stallion Studios when the studio merged with Falcon in 2011. His notable credits include Grabby Award-nominated performances in Heaven to Hell (2005) and The Velvet Mafia (2006), and the 2007 film The Ivy League, for which he won two Grabby Awards. Rhodes was noted by outlets as one of the final gay porn stars to achieve widespread recognition and fame "in an industry increasingly faltering amidst the explosion of piracy and amateur cam sites."

Beyond his work in pornography, Rhodes was active as a socialite in gay New York nightlife, with The New York Times describing him as "an unlikely celebrity in some New York social circles." He attended New York Fashion Week, and was written about frequently by Page Six and Gawker. Rhodes was often linked to the fashion designer Marc Jacobs, though Rhodes denied that their relationship was romantic or sexual in nature. He also appeared in an advertising campaign for the department store Loehmann's, in the 2007 mainstream comedy-drama film Dedication, and in L.A. Zombie, a 2010 experimental film by director Bruce LaBruce. Rhodes recorded his own music, and published it on his MySpace profile.

Later career and death

Rhodes continued to work as an escort while simultaneously shooting films with Falcon, and expressed skepticism about the gay adult entertainment industry in the final years of his life. Rhodes was open about his struggles with drug use and depression, and maintained a blog where he wrote frequently about his use of anabolic steroids and club drugs.

On June 14, 2012, Rhodes died in his sleep from cardiac arrest at the age of 30. Though an official cause of death was never released, outlets noted that Rhodes stated on his blog in the days preceding his death that he was cycling multiple steroids, including human growth hormone. In one of his final blog entries, Rhodes wrote regarding his steroid use that he was "waiting until i pop. Or my liver to fail... which every  comes first." Rhodes' death was noted as one of several prominent deaths and deaths by suicide that occurred in the gay pornography industry in 2012 and 2013, alongside Arpad Miklos, Roman Ragazzi, and Wilfried Knight. A private funeral for Rhodes was held in Lake Ronkonkoma, New York; his remains were cremated, per his family's request.

In an obituary written for The New York Times, Rhodes was posthumously outed as HIV positive, with writer Jacob Bernstein revealing that Rhodes had previously been diagnosed while preparing to shoot a scene for the gay pornography website Randy Blue. Since Rhodes did not publicly reveal his HIV status during his lifetime, the Times''' disclosure was the subject of controversy.

Filmography
As actor

As director

Awards

|-
! scope="row" | 2006
| Heaven to Hell| Best Group Sex Scene
| Grabby Awards
| 
| 
| 
|-
! scope="row" | 2006
| 
| Best Newcomer
| Grabby Awards
| 
| 
| 
|-
! scope="row" | 2007
| 
| Best Performer
| Grabby Awards
| 
| 
| 
|-
! scope="row" | 2007
| 
| Best Versatile Performer
| Grabby Awards
| 
| 
|  
|-
! scope="row" | 2007
| The Velvet Mafia| Best Actor
| Grabby Awards
| 
| 
|  
|-
! scope="row" | 2008
| Ivy League| Best Actor
| Grabby Awards
| 
| Tied with Jason Ridge.
| 
|-
! scope="row" | 2008
| 
|  Best Versatile Performer
| Grabby Awards
| 
| 
| 
|-
! scope="row" | 2008
| Ivy League| Best Group Sex Scene
| Grabby Awards
| 
| 
| 
|-
! scope="row" | 2008
| Ivy League| Best Rimming Scene
| Grabby Awards
| 
| 
| 
|-
! scope="row" | 2008
| 
| Performer of the Year
| GayVN Awards
| 
| 
| 
|-
! scope="row" | 2008
| Ivy League''
| Best Actor
| GayVN Awards
| 
| 
|  
|-
! scope="row" | 2009
| 
| GLBT Performer of the Year
| XBIZ Awards
| 
| 
| 
|-

See also
 LGBT culture in New York City
 List of LGBT people from New York City
 List of male performers in gay porn films

References

External links

 
 
 

1982 births
2012 deaths
American actors in gay pornographic films
American bloggers
American male bloggers
American male pornographic film actors
American pornographic film directors
Directors of gay pornographic films
American gay artists
Gay pornographic film actors
Gay sportsmen
Identical twins
LGBT film directors
American gay actors
LGBT people from New York (state)
LGBT pornographic film actors
People from Long Island
People with HIV/AIDS
Pornographic film actors from New York (state)
American twins